Horace Cornellius Copeland (born January 2, 1971) is a former professional American football player who played wide receiver for seven seasons for the Tampa Bay Buccaneers, Miami Dolphins and Oakland Raiders.  Copeland was drafted in the 4th round, (#103 overall) of the 1993 NFL Draft.

Copeland is a graduate of Maynard Evans High School in Orlando, Florida, where he also established state records in the high jump and long jump. His high school made it to the 6A Football State Championship, which helped him earn a scholarship to the University of Miami, where he played until his graduation.

Throughout his playing career in the NFL, Copeland frequently celebrated touchdowns by performing a backflip.

Copeland is married to Tangela Copeland with whom he has four children. He retired in 2000.

References 

1971 births
Living people
Players of American football from Orlando, Florida
American football wide receivers
Miami Hurricanes football players
Tampa Bay Buccaneers players
Miami Dolphins players
Ed Block Courage Award recipients